Luxury is the second studio album by Japanese musician Fantastic Plastic Machine. It was released on September 10, 1998, by Readymade Records. The album was released in Germany on March 29, 1999, by Bungalow Records and in the United States on April 27, 1999, by Emperor Norton Records.

Luxury is a continuation of Fantastic Plastic Machine's previous work in Shibuya-kei, though in some tracks there are indications of a shift towards house music with 1960s northern soul and 1970s Philadelphia soul influences, a path he explored more on his next album Beautiful. Luxury features guest vocals from Lorraine Bowen, Simon Fisher Turner, and Yukari Fresh, among others.

Critical reception

Sarah Zupko of PopMatters wrote, "Luxury revels in international, otherworldly sounds and collaborations with musicians who perfectly suit Tanaka's experimental bent." She called the album "an enjoyable, eclectic effort that fans of sophisticated Euro pop are sure to adore." In 2020, Tokyo Weekender writer Ed Cunningham described Luxury as "more refined" than Fantastic Plastic Machine's self-titled debut, but nonetheless still an "inventive" work.

Track listing

Notes
 On the German edition, the radio edit of "There Must Be an Angel" appears as track two, while the "Mix for Mirror Ball" version appears as track 14.

References

External links
 

1998 albums
Fantastic Plastic Machine (musician) albums
Nippon Columbia albums
Emperor Norton Records albums